Bharatpur Airport  s a domestic airport located in Bharatpur serving Chitwan District, a district in Bagmati Province in Nepal. The airport is one of two airports in the vicinity of Bharatpur Metropolitan City, the other one being Meghauli Airport. It is considered to be the main tourist gateway to Chitwan National Park.

History 
This airport was built as part of the resettlement and malaria control program in the Chitwan Valley, with the assistance of the Government of the United States of America. The airport was built in 1958 and the first passenger flight landed at the airport on 5 March 1965. From 1981 to 1985, the airport was shut down due political instabilities in Southern Nepal.
In 2005, a new terminal was built and the 1158-metre runway was paved to enable medium-sized aircraft. A proposal for further expansion to provide additional services and expand land coverage was passed in 2019.

Facilities
It has one runway, which measures .

Airlines and destinations

Incidents and accidents 
31 July 1993 – An Everest Air flight operated on a Dornier 228-101, on a flight from Kathmandu to Bharatpur, struck a mountain and crashed while approaching Bharatpur. All 3 crew and 16 passengers were killed.

See also
List of airports in Nepal

References

External links
 

Airports in Nepal
Chitwan District
Buildings and structures in Bharatpur, Nepal